Anna Van Marcke (18 April 1924 – June 2012) was a Belgian sprint canoeist who competed in the late 1940s. She finished seventh in the K-1 500 m event at the 1948 Summer Olympics in London. Van Marcke died in Vilvoorde in June 2012, at the age of 88.

References

Sources
Anna Van Marcke's profile at Sports Reference.com

1924 births
2012 deaths
Belgian female canoeists
Canoeists at the 1948 Summer Olympics
Olympic canoeists of Belgium